Claim House may refer to:

Claim House (Davenport, Iowa), NRHP-nominated
St. Nicholas Hotel (Omaha, Nebraska)